Rosalyn may refer to:

"Rosalyn" (song), song by Pretty Things

People
Rosalyn Borden (1932–2003), American actress
Rosalynn Carter, wife of former President of the United States Jimmy Carter
Rosalyn Gold-Onwude (born 1987), American basketball analyst
Rosalyn Higgins, Baroness Higgins (born 1937), former President of the International Court of Justice
Rosalyn Landor (born 1958), English actress
Rosalynne Montoya, American model, transgender rights activist, and internet celebrity
Rosalynn Sumners (born 1964), American figure skater
Rosalyn Sussman Yalow, American medical physicist
Rosalyn Tureck (1914-2003), American pianist and harpsichordist

Fictional characters
Rosalyn (Calvin and Hobbes), minor character in Calvin and Hobbes
Rosalyn, character in the concept album Psychoderelict (1993)

English feminine given names
Given names derived from plants or flowers